Brandon Auret (born 27 December 1972) is a South African actor known for his role as Leon du Plessis in the SABC3 soap opera Isidingo.

Early life 
Auret was born 27 December 1972 in the South African city of Johannesburg.  He currently resides in Gauteng, South Africa.

Acting career 
Auret played the role of Leon du Plessis from 1998 to 2005. After leaving this soap opera he starred in the GO/M-Net dramatic series Angel's Song as William.  This role was from 2006 through 2007. His other television acting credits include: Zet, Egoli, SOS, Laugh Out Loud, One Way, Wild at Heart and Tshisa.

Auret also appears in the South African movie District 9.

His stage credits include: Joseph and the Amazing Technicolor Dreamcoat, Sleeping Beauty, The Buddy Holly Story, Alladin, The Doo-Wah Boys, Summer Holiday, Forever Young, Jukebox Hero, Debbie Does Dallas, Khalushi and Strictly Come Party.

Auret is a co-owner and producer of the broadcast media and film production company A Breed Apart Pictures.

Filmography

References

External links 

1972 births
Living people
People from Johannesburg
South African male film actors
South African male television actors